Dobroskok is a gender-neutral Slavic surname. Notable people with the surname Dobroskok include:

Aleksandr Dobroskok (born 1982), Russian diver 
Dmitry Dobroskok (born 1984), Russian diver, brother of Aleksandr

Russian-language surnames